James Saunders may refer to:

 James Saunders (boxer) (born 1932), Canadian boxer
 James Saunders (composer) (born 1972), British composer
 James Saunders (cricketer) (1802–1832), English cricketer
 James Saunders (playwright) (1925–2004), English playwright
 James Saunders (footballer) (1878–?), English footballer
 James Saunders (dancer), American dancer, choreographer and movement teacher
 James Ebenezer Saunders (1829–1909), British architect